Vandergrift Historic District is a national historic district located at Vandergrift, Westmoreland County, Pennsylvania. It encompasses 625 contributing buildings and 2 contributing sites in Vandergrift.  They were built between about 1895 and 1925, and includes a mix of residential, commercial, and institutional properties. They are in a variety of popular architectural styles including Romanesque, Queen Anne, and Colonial Revival, and laid out on a plan developed by Frederick Law Olmsted. Notable non-residential buildings include the Casino, train station, company office building, and churches.  The two contributing sites are landscaped parks.

It was added to the National Register of Historic Places in 1995.

References

External links

Historic districts on the National Register of Historic Places in Pennsylvania
Romanesque Revival architecture in Pennsylvania
Queen Anne architecture in Pennsylvania
Colonial Revival architecture in Pennsylvania
Historic districts in Westmoreland County, Pennsylvania
National Register of Historic Places in Westmoreland County, Pennsylvania